The smoky-fronted tody-flycatcher (Poecilotriccus fumifrons) is a species of bird in the family Tyrannidae, and one of twelve in the genus Poecilotriccus. It is found in Brazil, French Guiana, and Suriname. Its natural habitats are subtropical or tropical dry forests and subtropical or tropical moist lowland forests.

References

smoky-fronted tody-flycatcher
Birds of the Guianas
Birds of Brazil
smoky-fronted tody-flycatcher
Birds of the Amazon Basin
Taxonomy articles created by Polbot